Love (stylized as LØVË, using Metal umlaut) is the third and final EP by American singer and songwriter Aaron Carter, released on February 10, 2017 by Sony Music. It is the first collection of songs released by Carter since 2002.

Background
On April 1, 2016, Carter released "Fool's Gold" as the first single from the EP. When speaking of the EP, Carter told Billboard:"'The 'LøVë' album and 'Fool's Gold' era has been D.I.Y. hustle since day one. "Everything from the production, songwriting, mixing, photoshoots, music videos, packaging and distribution have been a collective involvement from a team I like to call 'Team Fool's Gold.'"

The second single, "Sooner or Later", was released in January 2017.

Reception
The EP received positive reception by music critics, with Entertainment Weekly saying "Sooner or Later" was "no "Aaron’s Party" — it's better". El Broide wrote that [Carter] "decided to take a tropical house approach with the project incorporating strong pop influences – and it works."

Track listing 
All songs are written by Jon Asher, Melanie Fontana, Taylor Helgeson, Michel Schulz and Aaron Carter; while being produced by the latter two.

Charts

References 

2017 EPs
Aaron Carter albums
Sony Music EPs